The Real World: Miami is the fifth season of MTV's reality television series The Real World, which focuses on a group of diverse strangers living together for several months in a different city each season, as cameras follow their lives and interpersonal relationships. It is the first season of The Real World to be filmed in the South Atlantic States region of the United States, specifically in Florida.

The season featured seven people who lived in a house on Rivo Alto Island and was the first season filmed in the United States outside of New York and California. Production for the season started from February to July 1996. The season premiered on July 10 of that year, consisted of 22 episodes. This is the first of two seasons filmed in Florida. Ten years later, the show set its seventeenth season, returning to the state in the Key Haven neighborhood of Key West.

Season changes
This was the first season in which the housemates were given a season-long assignment or task, an aspect of the series that would continue in almost all subsequent seasons (the Brooklyn and D.C. seasons dispensed with it). This season the cast was given $50,000 startup money to begin a business of their choosing. The cast's efforts were marked by much disorganization and conflict, and while ideas such as a dessert delivery service and a fashion line were floated about, they were ultimately not able to start the business.

The residence
The house is located at 445 E Rivo Alto Dr, in Miami Beach, just north of the Venetian Causeway on affluent Rivo Alto Island. Its current owner is former Ford CEO Jacques Nasser.

Cast

: Age at the time of filming.

Duration of cast 

Notes
Melissa voluntarily leaves the house in Episode 20 after an argument with Sarah.

Episodes

After filming
In 1998, Joe Patane published his memoirs about his experiences on the show, Livin' in Joe's World: Unauthorized, Uncut, and Unreal: The Memoirs of Joe Patane from the Miami Cast of MTV's The Real World.

During The Real World Reunion 2000, the first reunion show that involved the Miami cast, Flora revealed that she and Mitchell got married. Joe revealed that he and Nicole broke up, to which Mike expressed relief, because, as he told Joe, Nicole was a "bitch".

At the 2008 The Real World Awards Bash, Dan received a nomination for "Best Meltdown" because of his fight with Melissa, while Flora received one in the "Best Phonecall Gone Bad" category.

Flora Alekseyeun appeared nude in the May 2002 issue of Playboy magazine, along with other alumnae of The Real World and Road Rules: Beth Stolarczyk, Veronica Portillo and Jisela Delgado. In 2020, she appeared on E! reality series Botched.

Cynthia Roberts appeared in "Floating Deck", a 2008 episode of the DIY Network show Yard Crashers, which depicted the renovation of her back yard.

After a career in runway and print fashion modeling, Dan Renzi became a model scout for a Chicago agency, a field researcher with the Los Angeles Department of Epidemiology and director of AIDS/HIV program at the Kansas City Gay and Lesbian Center. He has made appearances at celebrity Spring Break parties in the Bahamas. He has also contributed to the New York Post and the Miami New Times, and chronicles all his adventures at his own blog, How Was Your Day, Dan?  He is now a Registered Nurse based in his home state of Kansas, and has been working on the front lines of the coronavirus outbreak in New York City.

The Challenge

Bold indicates the contestant was a finalist on The Challenge.

Notes

References

External links
The Real World: Miami at MTV.com
Cast page at MTV.com
Episode synopsis list at MTV.com

Miami
Television shows set in Miami
1996 American television seasons
Television shows filmed in Miami